Pulsatilla vulgaris, the pasqueflower, is a species of flowering plant belonging to the buttercup family (Ranunculaceae), found locally on calcareous grassland in Europe, and widely cultivated in gardens. It was considered part of the genus Anemone, to which it is closely related. Several sources still list Anemone pulsatilla as the accepted name, with Pulsatilla vulgaris as a synonym.  

Other variations of its common name include European pasqueflower and common pasqueflower. The name may also be split in two - pasque flower.

Description
This herbaceous perennial plant develops upright rhizomes, which function as food-storage organs. Its leaves and stems are long, soft, silver-grey and hairy. The finely-dissected leaves are arranged in a rosette and appear with the bell-shaped flower in early spring. The purple flowers are followed by distinctive silky seed-heads which can persist on the plant for many months.

The flower is 'cloaked in myth'; one legend has it that Pasque flowers sprang up in places that had been soaked by the blood of Romans or Danes because they often appear on old barrows and boundary banks.

This plant has gained the Royal Horticultural Society's Award of Garden Merit.

Designation
It is classified as a Priority Species in the UK Biodiversity Action Plan and as Vulnerable in Britain on the Red Data List.

Location
It grows in sparsely wooded pine forests or meadows, often on a sunny sloping side with calcium-rich soil.  A large colony occurs on publicly accessible land in the Cotswolds, UK, at the Gloucestershire Wildlife Trust's Pasqueflower reserve.

Additional general information
It is the county flower of the English counties of Cambridgeshire and Hertfordshire.

Varieties
While the species Pulsatilla vulgaris has purplish flowers; variants include red ('Rubra') and white ('Alba') forms (see images).

References

External links

 Gloucestershire Wildlife Trust

vulgaris
Plants described in 1753
Taxa named by Carl Linnaeus
Taxa named by Philip Miller